Sedat Ağçay (born 22 September 1981, Muş, Turkey) is a Turkish football coach and former professional footballer who is currently the manager of Süper Lig club Ankaragücü.

Career
He has played for Zeytinburnuspor, Yozgatspor, Elazigspor, Gaziantepspor, Konyaspor and Antalyaspor.

External links
 Guardian Stats Centre
 
 
 

1981 births
Living people
Antalyaspor footballers
Süper Lig players
Konyaspor footballers
Gaziantepspor footballers
People from Bulanık
Kurdish sportspeople
TFF First League players
Yeni Malatyaspor footballers
Association football midfielders
Turkish footballers
Süper Lig managers
MKE Ankaragücü managers